Paul Muntean (born  in Baia Mare) is a Romanian bobsledder.

Muntean competed at the 2014 Winter Olympics for Romania. He teamed with driver Andreas Neagu, Florin Cezar Crăciun, Dănuț Moldovan and Bogdan Laurentiu Otavă in the four-man event, finishing 24th.

As of April 2014, his best showing at the World Championships is 26th, coming in the four-man event in 2013.

He also competed in the 2018 Winter Olympics.

References

1984 births
Living people
Olympic bobsledders of Romania
Sportspeople from Baia Mare
Bobsledders at the 2014 Winter Olympics
Bobsledders at the 2018 Winter Olympics
Romanian male bobsledders